West New York is a town in the northern part of Hudson County, in the U.S. state of New Jersey, situated upon the New Jersey Palisades. As of the 2020 United States census, the town's population was 52,912, an increase of 3,204 (+6.4%) from the 2010 census count of 49,708, which in turn reflected an increase of 3,940 (+8.6%) from the 45,768 counted in the 2000 census. The Census Bureau's Population Estimates Program calculated that the city's population was 52,242 in 2021, ranking the city the 761st-most-populous in the country.

History
West New York was incorporated as a town by an act of the New Jersey Legislature on July 8, 1898, replacing Union Township, based on the results of a referendum held three days earlier. West New York underwent a massive growth at the beginning of the 20th century, driven by development of textile industries that made North Hudson the "Embroidery Capital of the United States".

The town was populated mainly with Italian Americans and German Americans. The 1960s saw an influx of Cuban émigrés to the area, once called Havana on the Hudson; it has since become one of the United States cities with a majority Hispanic population. Simultaneously, high-rise apartments, some of the tallest buildings in North Hudson, were built along Boulevard East, adding to the population of the town, giving it one of highest population densities in the country. Since the 1980s the Hudson waterfront, which had been part of the Weehawken Terminal, has been redeveloped from industrial to residential and recreational uses, including the Hudson River Waterfront Walkway.

Geography

According to the United States Census Bureau, the town had a total area of 1.33 square miles (3.44 km2), including 0.99 square miles (2.58 km2) of land and 0.33 square miles (0.86 km2) of water (25.11%).

The ZIP Code for West New York is 07093. West New York is part of the New York metropolitan area and is at the heart of the North Hudson, New Jersey, region. West New York is bordered on the north by Guttenberg, on the east by the Hudson River, on the south by Union City and Weehawken, and on the west by North Bergen.

West New York is one of North Hudson's communities atop The Palisades above the Hudson River, and home to the highest point in the county. Its Hudson Waterfront has been known as Bulls Ferry since before the American Revolutionary War. Bergenline Avenue is its main commercial thoroughfare, while the wide two-way 60th Street is a major cross-town thoroughfare, and site of Town Hall. More than half of U.S. Presidents have streets bearing their name in the town.

The town borders the municipalities of Guttenberg, North Bergen, Union City and Weehawken in Hudson County; and the New York City borough of Manhattan across the Hudson River.

Demographics

One of 41 municipalities statewide where a majority of residents do not speak English as their primary language, Spanish is spoken at home by more than half of the residents of West New York, according to data from the United States Census Bureau's 2012-2016 American Community Survey data. The town had 83.6% of residents not speaking English as their dominant language, the second highest in the state.

2010 census

As of the 2010 United States census, West New York had the third-highest percentage of Hispanics in the state, at 78.1%, accounting for 2.5% of the state's Hispanic population. Though Native Americans comprise less than 1% of the city's population, they doubled in the 2000s, and combined with Union City's Native Americans comprise 38% of the county's Native American population.

The Census Bureau's 2006–2010 American Community Survey showed that (in 2010 inflation-adjusted dollars) median household income was $44,657 (with a margin of error of ± $2,850) and the median family income was $42,534 (± $3,689). Males had a median income of $36,768 (± $2,414) versus $30,688 (± $1,952) for females. The per capita income for the borough was $24,419 (± $1,215). About 15.8% of families and 18.1% of the population were below the poverty line, including 23.6% of those under age 18 and 25.6% of those age 65 or over.

2000 census
As of the 2000 United States census, there were 45,768 people, 16,719 households, and 11,034 families residing in the town. The population density was  44,995.1/mi2 (17,324.6/km2). There were 17,360 housing units at an average density of 17,066.8/mi2 (6,571.3 km2). The racial makeup of the town was 60.09% White, 3.55% African American, 0.67% Native American, 2.93% Asian, 0.03% Pacific Islander, 25.16% from other races, and 7.57% from two or more races. 78.74% of the population were Hispanic or Latino of any race.

There were 16,719 households, out of which 31.1% had children under the age of 18 living with them, 41.9% were married couples living together, 16.9% had a woman whose husband did not live with her, and 34.0% were non-families. 27.5% of all households were made up of individuals, and 11.3% had someone living alone who was 65 years of age or older. The average household size was 2.74 and the average family size was 3.30.

In the town, the age distribution of the population showed 22.3% under the age of 18, 10.9% from 18 to 24, 34.1% from 25 to 44, 19.9% from 45 to 64, and 12.7% who were 65 years of age or older. The median age was 34 years. For every 100 females, there were 96.4 males. For every 100 females age 18 and over, there were 94.5 males.

The median income for a household in the town was $31,980, and the median income for a family was $34,083. Males had a median income of $26,703 versus $22,326 for females. The per capita income for the town was $16,719. 18.9% of the population and 16.1% of families were below the poverty line. Out of the total people living in poverty, 25.4% were under the age of 18 and 22.3% were 65 or older.

As of the 2000 Census, West New York was ranked as #52 on a list of cities with the highest percentage of renters. 80.1% of West New York residents lived in renter-occupied housing units, vs. 33.8% nationwide.

Economy
Bergenline Avenue is the main shopping district of North Hudson. West New York's Urban Enterprise Zone, one of seven established by legislation in 1996, covers portions of Bergenline Avenue from 49th to 67th Streets.

Portions of town are part of an Urban Enterprise Zone, including portions of Bergenline Avenue from 49th to 67th Streets. West New York was selected in 1996 as one of a group of seven zones added to participate in the program. In addition to other benefits to encourage employment and investment within the UEZ, shoppers can take advantage of a reduced 3.3125% sales tax rate (half of the % rate charged statewide) at eligible merchants. Established in May 1996, the town's Urban Enterprise Zone status expires in May 2027.

Until the 1880s, the primary commercial area of West New York was Palisade Avenue. An influential citizen named Henry Kohlmeier who lived there objected to the noise created by horse-drawn public coaches, which led to the route being transferred one block west to what is now Bergenline Avenue (formerly Lewis Street), which runs parallel to Palisade Avenue, and which remains the city's main commercial thoroughfare. Currently the longest commercial avenue in the state, boasting over 300 retail stores and restaurants, Bergenline runs through not only the entire length of West New York from north to south, but also through Union City, Guttenberg and North Bergen, making it the main commercial strip for North Hudson. Also known as the "Miracle Mile", Bergenline's largest concentration of retail and chain stores begins at the intersection of 32nd Street in Union City, and continues north until 92nd Street in North Bergen. Bergenline Avenue is also used as the route for local parades, such as the annual Memorial Day Parade Cuban Day Parade and Dominican-American Parade.

Sports
In 1898, the Brooklyn Bridegrooms played two games at the West New York Field Club Grounds. The New York Giants played one game at the field in 1898 and four in 1899.

Government

Local government

Since 1931, West New York has been governed under the Walsh Act form of New Jersey municipal government. The town is one of 30 municipalities (of the 564) statewide that use the commission form of government. The governing body is comprised of a five-member commission, whose members are elected at-large in non-partisan elections to serve four-year terms of office on a concurrent basis as part of the May municipal election. Each Commissioner is assigned to head one of five departments. The Commission selects one of its members to serve as mayor.

, the five members of the West New York Board of Commissioners are 
Mayor Gabriel Rodriguez (Commissioner of Public Safety),
Victor M. Barrera (Commissioner of Parks and Public Property),
Cosmo A. Cirillo (Commissioner of Public Affairs),
Margarita A. Guzman (Commissioner of Revenue and Finance)
Yoleisy Yanez (Commissioner of Public Works), all serving concurrent terms of office ending May 16, 2023.

In the May 2011 municipal election, the "Together We Can" slate of five candidates led by Roque took all five seats on the Town Council, knocking off the slate of incumbents led by then-mayor Silverio Vega. At the town council's reorganization meeting, the five commissioners unanimously voted to appoint Roque to a four-year term as Mayor of West New York.

In February 2015, Cosmo Cirillo was selected to fill the vacant seat of Rubin Vargas, making Cirillo the youngest commissioner on town history at the age of 27.

Federal, state and county representation
West New York is located in the 8th Congressional District and is part of New Jersey's 32nd state legislative district. Prior to the 2011 reapportionment following the 2010 census, West New York had been in the 33rd state legislative district.

 

West New York is in Hudson County's 7th Freeholder District. Hudson County Board of County Commissioners District 7 comprises Weehawken, West New York, and Guttenberg and is represented by Caridad Rodriguez.

Politics
As of March 2011, there were a total of 19,438 registered voters in West New York, of which 10,510 (54.1%) were registered as Democrats, 2,460 (12.7%) were registered as Republicans and 6,456 (33.2%) were registered as Unaffiliated. There were 12 voters registered to other parties.

In the 2012 presidential election, Democrat Barack Obama received 77.5% of the vote (9,682 cast), ahead of Republican Mitt Romney with 21.8% (2,725 votes), and other candidates with 0.7% (85 votes), among the 12,605 ballots cast by the town's 21,268 registered voters (113 ballots were spoiled), for a turnout of 59.3%. In the 2008 presidential election, Democrat Barack Obama received 69.6% of the vote (9,071 cast), ahead of Republican John McCain with 29.0% (3,773 votes) and other candidates with 0.6% (78 votes), among the 13,026 ballots cast by the town's 21,023 registered voters, for a turnout of 62.0%. In the 2004 presidential election, Democrat John Kerry received 60.8% of the vote (7,229 ballots cast), outpolling Republican George W. Bush with 36.4% (4,329 votes) and other candidates with 0.3% (54 votes), among the 11,883 ballots cast by the town's 18,058 registered voters, for a turnout percentage of 65.8.

In the 2013 gubernatorial election, Democrat Barbara Buono received 55.9% of the vote (3,188 cast), ahead of Republican Chris Christie with 42.4% (2,416 votes), and other candidates with 1.6% (94 votes), among the 5,978 ballots cast by the town's 22,092 registered voters (280 ballots were spoiled), for a turnout of 27.1%. In the 2009 gubernatorial election, Democrat Jon Corzine received 71.2% of the vote (5,328 ballots cast), ahead of Republican Chris Christie with 25.5% (1,907 votes), Independent Chris Daggett with 1.3% (97 votes) and other candidates with 0.9% (67 votes), among the 7,481 ballots cast by the town's 19,045 registered voters, yielding a 39.3% turnout.

Education

West New York is served by the West New York School District for pre-kindergarten through twelfth grade. The district is one of 31 former Abbott districts statewide that were established pursuant to the decision by the New Jersey Supreme Court in Abbott v. Burke which are now referred to as "SDA Districts" based on the requirement for the state to cover all costs for school building and renovation projects in these districts under the supervision of the New Jersey Schools Development Authority.

As of the 2019–20 school year, the district, comprised of nine schools, had an enrollment of 8,545 students and 593.0 classroom teachers (on an FTE basis), for a student–teacher ratio of 14.3:1. Schools in the district (with 2019–20 enrollment data from the National Center for Education Statistics) are 
Early Childhood School with 502 students in Pre-K, 
Public School #1 with 860 students in grades K–6, 
Public School #2 with 716 students in grades K–6, 
Robert Menendez Elementary School (School #3) with 574 students in grades K–6, 
Albio Sires Elementary School (School #4) with 678 students in grades K–6, 
Public School #5 with 673 students in grades K–6, 
Harry L. Bain Elementary School (School #6) with 675 students in grades K–6, 
West New York Middle School with 1,125 students in grades 7–8 and 
Memorial High School with 2,079 students in grades 9–12.

Private schools in West New York include Academy of St. Joseph of the Palisades, a K-8 Catholic school, which is overseen by the Roman Catholic Archdiocese of Newark. In the wake of declining enrollment and lingering financial issues, Mother Seton Interparochial School (which had been formed in 2006 from the merger of St. Michael's and St. Anthony of Padua) and St. Augustine's School, both of which had been located in Union City, were closed by the Newark Archdiocese after the 2019-20 school year and merged into Academy of St. Joseph of the Palisades.

American Training School for Medical Professionals is a bilingual medical school founded in 1998 by Professor Dante Joa.

Emergency services
West New York does not have its own fire department, but is one of five municipalities served by the North Hudson Regional Fire and Rescue.

The West New York Emergency Medical Squad consists of 26 people (as of May 2011) who are based at the EMS house on 62nd Street, which houses four trucks, to which each is assigned two workers. The Squad's second, larger facility, at 66th Street, opened May 11, 2011.

West New York's Emergency Medical Services was among the many Hudson County agencies that responded to the January 2009 crash of US Airways Flight 1549, for which they received accolades from the survivors.

Transportation

Roads and highways

The only significant roads directly serving West New York are county highways. County Route 501 follows Kennedy Boulevard along the town's western border. County Route 505 follows Boulevard East and Anthony Defino Way on the east side of town. Both roads are oriented north–south. Interstate 95 (the New Jersey Turnpike), U.S. Route 1/9 and New Jersey Route 495 are major highways located in adjacent municipalities.

Public transportation

NJ Transit bus service is available to the Port Authority Bus Terminal in Midtown Manhattan on the 128, 154, 156, 158, 159, 165, 166 and 168 routes. The 181 and 188 routes offer service to the George Washington Bridge Bus Terminal. Travel to other New Jersey communities, including Jersey City, is offered on the 22, 23, 84, 86, 88 and 89.

The Bergenline Avenue station of Hudson-Bergen Light Rail is located at the city line with Union City, while the Weehawken Port Imperial station is located on the Weehawken waterfront at the foot of Pershing Road near the NY Waterway ferry terminal. Regular ferry crossings of the Hudson River run daily.

Jitney commuter buses operate along Bergenline Avenue, providing service to the Port Authority Bus Terminal, the George Washington Bridge Bus Station, the Newport Centre and other local destinations. The county's most frequent route for dollar buses, jitneys operate along Bergenline Avenue as frequently as one bus every minute.

Media and culture
West New York is located within the New York media market, with most of its daily papers available for sale or delivery. The Jersey Journal is a local daily paper based in Jersey City. Local weeklies include the free bilingual paper, Hudson Dispatch Weekly, a former daily, The West New York Reporter, which is part of the Hudson Reporter group of local weeklies, and the Spanish language El Especialito. River View Observer is a monthly newspaper that covers the Hudson County waterfront market.

In the late 2000s, West New York, Weehawken, Union City and North Bergen came to be dubbed collectively as "NoHu", a North Hudson haven for local performing and fine artists, many of whom are immigrants from Latin America and other countries, in part due to lower housing costs compared to those in nearby art havens such as Hoboken, Jersey City and Manhattan.

Notable people

People who were born in, residents of, or otherwise closely associated with West New York include:

 Christine Elizabeth Abrahamsen (1916–1995), author of science fiction and gothic novels
 Nick Acocella (1943–2020), political journalist and author
 Ronald Alexander (1917–1995), playwright  best known for writing Broadway comedic plays.
 George Alvarez, actor known for the soap operas General Hospital, Port Charles and Guiding Light
 Manuela Arbeláez (born 1988), model and actress who has appeared on The Price Is Right
 Oscar L. Auf der Heide (1874–1945), represented New Jersey's 11th congressional district from 1925 to 1933, and the 14th congressional district from 1933 to 1935. Auf der Heide was a member of the town council from 1899 to 1902, and was a member and president of the board of education in 1903 and 1904, served on the board of assessors in 1912 and 1913 and was mayor of West New York from 1914 to 1917
 Tyson Beckford (born 1970), male supermodel
 Warren Boroson (born 1935), financial journalist, author and playwright
 James J. Braddock (1905–1974), heavyweight boxing champion
 Rob Byrnes (born 1958), author and blogger
 Sebastian Capozucchi (born 1995), professional footballer who plays as a defender for USL League One club Chattanooga Red Wolves
 Vincent J. Dellay (1907–1999), Congressman who represented 
 Emil Draitser (born 1937), author of 12 books and 135 short stories, professor of Russian at Hunter College
 Ruth Brewer Eisenberg (1902–1996), pianist who was "Ivory" of the inter-racial piano duo Ebony and Ivory
 Amber Lee Ettinger (born 1982), actress and internet celebrity who rose to fame in 2007 as "Obama Girl"
 Zulima Farber (born 1946), former New Jersey Attorney General
 Ada Ferrer, historian, writer and professor
 Noli Francisco (1941–2017), professional poker player
 Morton Freedgood (1913–2006), author of the novel The Taking of Pelham One Two Three
 Alan Gewirth (1912–2004), philosopher, a professor of philosophy at the University of Chicago and author of Reason and Morality
 Don Guardian (born 1953), politician who has represented the 2nd Legislative District in the New Jersey General Assembly since 2022
 Walter Hendl (1917–2007), conductor, composer and pianist
 Arthur Imperatore Sr. (1925–2020), businessman who founded the NY Waterway service
 Christopher Jackman (1916–1991), politician who served in both houses of the New Jersey Legislature, and was Speaker of the New Jersey General Assembly from 1978 until 1982
 Angelica M. Jimenez (born 1965), politician who has served in the New Jersey General Assembly since 2012, where she represents the 32nd Legislative District
 King Kamali (born 1972), IFBB professional bodybuilder
 AJ Lee (born 1987), actress and retired professional wrestler, best known for her time in WWE
 Herb Maack (1917–2007), former Brooklyn Dodgers (AAFC) player and college football head coach
 Ray Machado, Cuban-American musician and founder of the Cuban fusion band Máxima Alerta
 John Mahnken (born 1922), former professional basketball player
 Harold Martin (1918–2010), member of the New Jersey General Assembly
 Mayte Martínez (born 1991), Cuban American model, designer and television personality
 Edward James Olmos (born 1947), actor who lived in West New York from 1979 to 1987, while he built his stage career following his emigration from East Los Angeles
 Harry Otis (1886–1976), pitcher who played in five games for the Cleveland Naps in 1909
 Nelson J. Perez (born 1961), prelate of the Roman Catholic Church who serves as the 10th archbishop of the Archdiocese of Philadelphia
 Artie Pitt (1913–2002) gymnast who competed in eight events at the 1936 Summer Olympics
 Gene Prebola (born 1938), tight end who played in the NFL for the Oakland Raiders, Denver Broncos and New York Jets
 Caridad Rodriguez (born 1947), former member of the New Jersey General Assembly
 Jeff Roehl (born 1980), offensive lineman who played for the New York Giants
 Louis Romano (born 1930), member of the New Jersey General Assembly
 Felix Roque, Former Mayor of West New York
 Mathieu Schneider (born 1969), former professional ice hockey defenseman who played 1,289 games in the National Hockey League with ten different teams
 Dick Seay (1904–1981), Negro league baseball all-star second baseman
 Jeremy Shockey (born 1980), NFL football player who has played for the New York Giants, New Orleans Saints and Carolina Panthers
 Ozzie Silna (1932–2016), businessmen best known as being co-owner of the American Basketball Association's Spirits of St. Louis and the lucrative deal cut to fold that team during the ABA-NBA merger
 John Skevin (1927–1993), politician who served in both houses of the New Jersey Legislature
 Albio Sires (born 1951), former Mayor of West New York who serves in Congress representing 
 Isabel Toledo (1960–2019), fashion designer
 Vito Valentinetti (1928–2021), professional pitcher who played for five MLB seasons
 Silverio Vega (born 1956), former Mayor of West New York who served in the New Jersey General Assembly
 Armando Vilaseca, Commissioner of the Vermont Department of Education
 Jessica Vosk (born 1983), Broadway actress who has starred as Elphaba in the Second National Tour of Wicked
 Gerard Way (born 1977), musician, frontman of the alternative rock band My Chemical Romance
 Jacqueline Walker (born 1941), politician who served in the New Jersey General Assembly from 1984 to 1986
 Warren Wolf (1927–2019), high school football head coach and politician who served as an Ocean County freeholder and a New Jersey State Assemblyman

References

External links

 
1898 establishments in New Jersey
New Jersey Urban Enterprise Zones
North Hudson, New Jersey
Populated places established in 1898
New Jersey populated places on the Hudson River
Towns in Hudson County, New Jersey
Walsh Act